Bosnian may refer to:
Anything related to the state of Bosnia and Herzegovina or its inhabitants
Anything related to Bosnia (region) or its inhabitants
 Bosniaks, an ethnic group mainly inhabiting Bosnia and Herzegovina and one of three constitutive nations of Bosnia and Herzegovina
 Bosnians, people who live in, or come from, Bosnia and Herzegovina
 Bosnian Croats, an ethnic group and one of three constitutive nations of Bosnia and Herzegovina
 Bosnian Serbs, an ethnic group and one of the three constitutive nations of Bosnia and Herzegovina
 Bošnjani, the name of inhabitants of Bosnia during the Middle Ages
 Bosnian language

See also 
Bosniaks (disambiguation)
Bošnjak (disambiguation)
 List of Bosnians and Herzegovinians
 Languages of Bosnia and Herzegovina
 Demographics of Bosnia and Herzegovina
 
 

Language and nationality disambiguation pages